Victoria "Vicky" Na (born 23 March 1991) is an Australian badminton player. She is of Indonesian and Thai descent. She has won an Australian age national championship and participated in several international badminton competitions.  Na made her Australian national badminton team debut in 2011 and was a member of the Australian 2012 Summer Olympics badminton team.

Personal
Nicknamed Vicky, Na was born on 23 March 1991 in Carlton, Victoria and  lives in Glen Waverley, Victoria. She attended Mount View Primary School, and then went on to high school at Wesley College (Victoria). She then completed her final high school years at Haileybury Girls College.   she is working on a Bachelor of Arts in Digital Arts at RMIT, starting her degree in 2009.

Career
Na plays singles women's badminton for the Badminton Academy of Victoria, located in Kilsyth, Victoria. She started competing in the sport in 2000 as a nine-year-old, and has always been coached by her father Kobeng Na.

In 2005, Na won the Australian junior national championships in the under-15 singles class. In 2007, she won the under-17 singles class at the Australasian Junior Championships. In 2009, she won the under-19 singles class at the Australasian Junior Championships. She finished first at the 2011 Ethiopia International 2011 in Addis Ababa, Ethiopia in the singles competition. She finished second at the 2012 Thomas Cup Preliminaries — Oceania in Ballarat, Australia in the team event. She finished first at the 2012 Uber Cup Preliminaries — Oceania in Ballarat, Australia in the team event. At the 2012 Yonex Australian Open Grand Prix Gold in Sydney, Australia in the singles event, she finished seventeenth. At the 2012 Air Tahiti Nui International Challenge in Punaauia, French Polynesia she finished ninth in the singles event. At the 2012 Thomas & Uber Cup in Wuhan China, she finished 9th in the team competition. In June 2012, she was scheduled to participate in a badminton international event in Auckland, New Zealand ahead of the Olympics where she will have a bye in the first round. In round two, she will meet Ching Chieh Tai from Chinese Taipei.

National team
Na made her national team debut in 2011. At the 2012 Oceania Championships in Ballarat, Australia, she finished third in the singles event and first in the team event. In June 2012, she was named to Australia's badminton team for the 2012 Summer Olympics. The Games was her first Olympic appearance.

Achievements

Oceania Championships
Women's Singles

Mixed Doubles

BWF International Challenge/Series
Women's Singles

Mixed Doubles

 BWF International Challenge tournament
 BWF International Series tournament
 BWF Future Series tournament

References

Australian female badminton players
1991 births
Australian people of Chinese descent
Living people
Badminton players at the 2012 Summer Olympics
Olympic badminton players of Australia
People from Glen Waverley, Victoria
Sportspeople from Melbourne
Sportswomen from Victoria (Australia)